Hasse Lake is a lake in Alberta.

Hasse Lake
Parkland County